Siona is a genus of moths in the family Geometridae erected by Philogène Auguste Joseph Duponchel in 1829.

Species
Siona galactica Prout, 1929
Siona lineata (Scopoli, 1763)

References

Ennominae